Department of Social Development may refer to:

 Department of Social Development (Canada)
 Department of Social Development (New Brunswick)
 Department of Social Development (South Africa)

See also
Ministry of Social Development (disambiguation)